The 1982–83 season was Cardiff City F.C.'s 56th season in the Football League. They competed in the 24-team Division Three, then the third tier of English football, finishing second and winning promotion to Division Two.

Players

 

Source.

League standings

Results by round

Fixtures and results

Third Division

Source

Milk Cup

FA Cup

Welsh Cup

See also

List of Cardiff City F.C. seasons

References

Bibliography

Welsh Football Data Archive

1982-83
English football clubs 1982–83 season
Welsh football clubs 1982–83 season